"When You're in Love with a Beautiful Woman" is an internationally successful single by Dr. Hook. It was recorded at Muscle Shoals Sound Studio, Alabama.

Written by Even Stevens, who followed producer Ron Haffkine into the studio bathroom to pitch him the song. "When You're in Love with a Beautiful Woman" first appeared on the band's 1978 album Pleasure and Pain. Riding the disco wave in 1979 it belatedly became an international hit, reaching number six on the Billboard Hot 100 singles chart in the USA and doing even better in the UK where it spent three weeks at number one in the UK Singles Chart in November 1979. The song was subsequently added to the band's 1979 album Sometimes You Win.

Chart performance

Weekly singles charts

Year-end charts

References

1979 singles
Dr. Hook & the Medicine Show songs
UK Singles Chart number-one singles
Irish Singles Chart number-one singles
Song recordings produced by Ron Haffkine
Songs written by Even Stevens (songwriter)
1978 songs
Capitol Records singles